Gert Fredholm (born 18 November 1941) is a Danish film director and screenwriter. He has directed nine films since 1967. His 1971 film Den forsvundne fuldmægtig was entered into the 22nd Berlin International Film Festival.

Filmography
 Tag en rask beslutning (1967)
 Astrid Henning-Jensen (1967)
 Den forsvundne fuldmægtig (1971)
 Terror (1977)
 Lille Virgil og Orla Frøsnapper (1980)
 At klappe med een hånd (2001)
 Dommeren (2005)
 En enkelt til Korsør (2008)
 Orla Frøsnapper (2011)

References

External links

1941 births
Living people
Danish film directors
Danish male screenwriters
People from Næstved